Cheer Chen Chi-chen (born 6 June 1975) is a Taiwanese singer-songwriter. Her most recent album, Sofa Sea, was released in 2018.

Early life 
Chen was born on 6 June 1975 in Taipei. Her mother supported her interest in music from an early age. Chen is an alumna of Taipei Municipal Jingmei Girls' Senior High School (臺北市立景美女子高級中學) and National Chengchi University (國立政治大學). Her song "Little School Song" (Chinese: 小小校歌) is generally regarded as the unofficial theme song of Jingmei Girls' Senior High School.

Career

Chen was the singer and guitarist in an underground band called Sunscreen (防曬油) in the 1990s. She produced her first solo demo recordings in 1997. At an early pub show, Chen was noticed and praised by notable Taiwanese rock musician Wu Bai. In 1997 she signed with Rock Records and her debut album Think Twice was released in July 1998, while she was still an undergraduate student at National Chengchi University. She graduated from that university with a Bachelor of Philosophy degree.

Chen is frequently involved in community volunteer activities. She was the first female singer-composer to perform on the stage of Taipei Arena. Chen has also appeared on stage several times with the Taiwanese band Mayday. Singer Ashin (陳信宏) of Mayday said of Chen, "I think that Cheer is a fantastic lyricist, her lyrics appear to be a soft knife that looks harmless but is actually sharp." Most of Chen's songs are in Mandarin Chinese, and occasionally in English. She writes most of her own music and lyrics. She plays acoustic guitar on most of her songs, and occasionally electric guitar and piano.

Chen's 2002 album Groupies was named one of the 200 best albums of all time by the Taiwanese Musician Institute. Chen left Rock Records in 2003 and has since released her records independently. In 2004-2005 she appeared in advertisements for Lee Jeans with Stanley Huang. A song she wrote for the commercials appeared on her fourth album Peripeteia in 2006. That album won the Best Music Album Producer Award and Best Music Video Award at the 17th Golden Melody Awards. Chen was also nominated for Best Female Singer and Best Album of the Year. In 2010 she was nominated for another Golden Melody Award for Best Songwriter.

In 2009, Chen became a spokesperson for Nikon cameras. In 2010 she was featured in an Adidas commercial alongside worldwide celebrities like Hyori Lee, David Beckham, and Oasis. In 2011 she became the spokesperson for Sokenbicha herbal drink for the Taiwanese market.

In 2009, Chen released her fifth album Immortal, which was recorded in her bedroom. The album was mastered by Grammy Award winner Bernie Grundman and was named one of the Top 10 Selling Mandarin Albums of the Year at the 2009 IFPI Hong Kong Album Sales Awards. The album was supported by an Asian and Australian tour that lasted until 2011.

In 2012, Chen formed an electronic/experimental music project with producer Tiger Chung called The Verse (originally The Voice). She has incorporated some songs from this project into her solo concerts. Chen released the album Songs of Transience in 2013. After taking a hiatus from music for several years, she released her seventh album Sofa Sea in December 2018.

Personal life 
Chen had been in a relationship with music producer Tiger Chung (鐘成虎) for more than a decade until 2019.

Discography

Studio albums

Verse discography
 52 Hertz 52赫茲 (23 January 2013)

Demo CDs 
 Demo1 (September 1997)
 Demo2 - Cheer's Walkman (March 2000)
 Demo3 (9 November 2001)
 Demo4 (12 December 2011)

Singles 
 Track 1 - "Sentimental Kills" (15 November 2003)
 Track 2 - "Travel with Sound" ("旅行的意義") (24 March 2004)
 Track 3 - "After 17" (31 December 2004), also included a track composed for Jing-mei Girls' Senior High School - 小小校歌
 Track 4 - "Pussy" (8 February 2007)
 Track 5 - "Fly for You" ("失敗者的飛翔") (13 July 2008)
 Track 6 - "Ephemera" ("蜉蝣") (5 October 2011)
 Track 7 - "The Long Goodbye" ("偶然與巧合") (1 December 2014)

Compilation albums 
 Cheer Chen - Princess From East '01 (21 June 2001)
 Rock Records HK Golden Decade Classics - The Best of Cheer Chen (October 2002)
 Cheer 1998-2005 (March 2005)

DVDs 
 Sixteen Days Cheer's Frame-001 (October 2005)
 Cheer's Flowers Concert Classic Memoirs + 2 CDs (May 2007)
 Cheer Looks: Cheer's Adventurous Image Diary - Cheer's Frame-002 (September 2007)
 Immortal Tour (May 2010)
 A Piece Of Summer II World Tour (September 2012)

Unreleased songs 
 Solitude (孤獨) Partially included as a hidden track after the last song(#10) in the first official album Think Twice Taiwan version
 A Practice (每天都是一種練習) Partially included as a short track(#7) in the third official album Groupies
 Monsoon (季風) Lyrics by Tiger Chung

Published works 
 《不厭其煩》(Bú Yàn Qí Fán) - collection of lomography with short notes (5 November 2001)
 LIVE.LIFE 《現場·生活》 2006 Calendar (December 2005)
 Placeless Place 《不在他方》(Bú Zài Tā Fāng) - a collection of essays written by Cheer published together with a newly released single "Chance or Coincidence / 偶然與巧合" (1 December 2014)

Notes and references

External links 

  Official website
  ∮Teamear Music

1975 births
Living people
Taiwanese Mandopop singer-songwriters
Taiwanese guitarists
Taiwanese pianists
Musicians from Taipei
Writers from Taipei
National Chengchi University alumni
21st-century Taiwanese singers
21st-century Taiwanese women singers
21st-century pianists
21st-century guitarists
21st-century women guitarists
21st-century women pianists